Deng Ming-Dao (born 1954, San Francisco) is a Chinese American author, artist, philosopher, teacher and martial artist. Deng is his family name; Ming-Dao is his given name. From a young age, he studied Taoist internal arts such as Qigong and Kung-Fu.

He is the author of 365 Tao, Everyday Tao, Scholar Warrior, and Chronicles of Tao. His books have been translated into fifteen languages. "He studied qigong, philosophy, meditation, and internal martial arts with Taoist master Kwan Saihung for thirteen years, and studied with two other masters before that." He is a "graphic designer and fine artist whose work is in several collections, including those of the Brooklyn Museum."

Publications
 The wandering Taoist. Harper & Row; 1983. . Harpercollins Paperback; 1986. .
 Seven bamboo tablets of the cloudy satchel. Harper & Row; 1987. . Harpercollins Paperback 1988. .
 Gateway to a Vast World. Harpercollins; 1989. .
 Scholar Warrior: An Introduction to the Tao in Everyday Life. HarperOne; 1990. .
 365 Tao: Daily Meditations. HarperSanFrancisco; 1992. .
 Chronicles of Tao: The Secret Life of a Taoist Master. HarperOne; 1993. .
 Everyday Tao: Living with Balance and Harmony. HarperOne; 1996. .
 Zen: The Art of Modern Eastern Cooking. Pavilion Books; 2001. .
 Le Tao au jour le jour : 365 méditations taoïstes. Albin Michel, Paris, Fr. 2002.  .
 The Living I Ching: Using Ancient Chinese Wisdom to Shape Your Life. HarperOne; 2006.  .
 The Lunar Tao: Meditations in Harmony with the Seasons. HarperOne; 2013.  & .

See also
 Taoism
 Taoist meditation

References

External links

Chinese spiritual writers
Chinese Taoists
French Taoists
Living people
1954 births
American Taoists
American writers of Chinese descent
Writers from San Francisco